Judah Ha-Levi is a crater on Mercury. Its name was adopted by the International Astronomical Union (IAU) in 1976. Judah Ha-Levi is named for the Spanish-Jewish poet and philosopher Judah Ha-Levi, who lived from 1075 to 1141.

Hollows are present within Judah Ha-Levi.

To the southeast of Judah Ha-Levi is the peak ring crater Wang Meng.  To the northwest is Glinka, and to the northeast is Chiang Kʽui.

References

Impact craters on Mercury